Gesser is a surname of South German origin. Notable people with the surname include:

Jason Gesser (born 1979), American football player and coach
Samuel Gesser (1930–2008), Canadian record producer

References

Surnames of German origin